Commandments is a 1997 American romantic comedy-drama which was written and directed by Daniel Taplitz and stars Aidan Quinn, Courteney Cox and Anthony LaPaglia. The executive producer was Ivan Reitman.

Plot Synopsis
Ever since Seth Warner's (Aidan Quinn) wife died two years ago, his life has gone to pieces. In his rage, he affronts God who seemingly responds by stopping his suicide attempt and his screaming at God above by crippling his dog and putting Seth in the hospital. So Seth sets out to break all of the ten commandments. Moving in with his sister-in-law, Rachel (Courteney Cox), and her reporter-husband, Harry (Anthony LaPaglia), he systematically starts breaking each of the commandments, increasingly aided by Harry and Rachel. When Rachel finds out Harry has been having an affair, she responds by having an affair with Seth. Seth then steals all of Harry's personally autographed guitars and pawns them, subsequently lying to the police that it was part of an insurance scam and Harry was in on it. Harry loses his job and finds out Rachel is pregnant with Seth's baby. Seth attempts to kill himself, but is swallowed by a whale and the belly is cut open and Seth is released. Rachel decides to marry Seth and raise the baby with him. Harry stands on top of a building with Seth's crippled dog the same way Seth did before and asks for a sign from God. Perhaps to be saved like Seth was.

Critical reception
The film has received negative reviews, with a 24% "rotten" rating by the review aggregator Rotten Tomatoes, based on 17 reviews.

References

External links

1997 films
1997 romantic comedy films
American romantic comedy films
1990s English-language films
Films about Christianity
Films about God
Gramercy Pictures films
Religious comedy films
Universal Pictures films
1997 directorial debut films
1990s American films